Mariska Aldrich (née Horvath; March 27, 1881 – September 28, 1965) was an American dramatic soprano singer and actress.

Life
She was born in Boston, Massachusetts. She was a pupil of Alfred Giraudet (1906–1909) and George Henschel.

She married J. Frank Aldrich on April 18, 1901.

She debuted at the Manhattan Opera House in 1908, as the Page in Les Huguenots. She sang with the Manhattan Opera House from 1909 to 1913. She was committed to the Metropolitan Opera in 1910–1911, where she performed the roles of Azucena in Il trovatore, Fricka in Das Rheingold, Lola in Cavalleria Rusticana, Naoia in Frederick Converse's Iolan, Or, the Pipe of Desire, and Venus in Tannhäuser, Her voice changed from contralto to dramatic soprano while she was in Europe. She sang the part of Brunnhilde in Bayreuth in 1914. She appeared on Broadway in 1924 in The Miracle.

Mariska was the subject of a portrait titled Caprice, created by artist Henry Salem Hubbell in 1908. This painting was in New York's National Arts Club and was the most publicized submission to the 1908 Paris Salon. Caprice is currently in the permanent collection of the Mulvane Art Museum (Topeka, Kansas) as part of the Endangered Art series.

She died in 1965. She was cremated at Los Angeles County Crematory on 6 October 1965. Her ashes are interred at Forest Lawn in Hollywood Hills.

Filmography

Mariska played a gloomy stiff zombie Igor-like woman called Hilda in Whistling in the Dark starring Red Skelton. Cult killers kidnap a radio sleuth (Red)and two girlfriends (Ann Rutherford, Virginia Grey) and force him to outline a perfect murder. In 1941 Conrad Veidt played the cult leader con whose parting lie was "I leave you in radiant contemplation." Director S. Sylvan Simon – Described as Suspense/Comedy. 1 hour 30 minutes Turner Classic Movies

References

External links
 
  Mariska Aldrich on the cover of The Burr Mcintonsh Monthly – magazine, April 1909

1881 births
1965 deaths
American stage actresses
Spouses of Illinois politicians
20th-century American actresses
20th-century American women opera singers
Musicians from Boston
Actresses from Boston
American operatic contraltos
American operatic sopranos
Classical musicians from Massachusetts